Choi Min-young (Korean: 최민영; born on 9 October 2002) is a South Korean child actor. He made his acting debut in 2014, since then, he has appeared in number of television series. He is known for his role as child actor in 2016 revenge series The Promise and 2022 coming-of-age TV series Twenty-Five Twenty-One as Baek Yi-hyun. In 2022, he is cast in American Netflix series XO, Kitty, as main lead.

Career
Choi Min-young has exclusive contract with artist management company Saram Entertainment since April 2022.

Choi Min-young made his debut in the KBS2 drama Magic Thousand Characters in 2014. Then he appeared in many TV series such as JTBC's Strong Girl Bong-soon (2017), tvN Mr. Sunshine (2018), and JTBC's Itaewon Class (2020). As a musical actor he has appeared in musicals Bonnie & Clyde, Empress Myeongseong, Frankenstein, and Kinky Boots. 

In 2022 he got recognition in tvN drama Twenty-Five Twenty-One in the role of Baek Yi-hyun, Baek Yi-jin's (Nam Joo-hyuk) younger brother. In same year he is also cast in American, Netflix series  XO, Kitty, a spin-off of To All the Boys I've Loved Before.

Filmography

Films

Television series

Musical shows

Awards and nominations

References

External links
 Choi Min-young, official website
 
 Choi Min-young on Daum 

Living people
2002 births
South Korean male child actors
21st-century South Korean male actors
South Korean male television actors
South Korean male film actors
South Korean male musical theatre actors
Dankook University alumni